PCW Ultra is an American independent professional wrestling promotion based in Los Angeles, California. The company predominantly features several different styles of professional wrestling such as hardcore wrestling, lucha libre, and catch wrestling. PCW Ultra was founded in 2016 by former NWA Heavyweight Champion and current MLW wrestler Josef Samael and Mike Scharnagl under the name Pacific Coast Wrestling.

PCW Ultra's roster consists of wrestlers and figures such as independent freelancers, signed talent, and retired legends.

History

Pacific Coast Wrestling (PCW) 
PCW Ultra was founded in January 2016 by Joseph Cabibbo (known professionally as Josef Samael) and Mike Scharnagl under the name Pacific Coast Wrestling (PCW). In an interview with Sports Illustrated Scharnagl talked about the formation of PCW Ultra, stating that he attended a wrestling show but felt that the show was lacking. Upon discovering the cost to establish a new promotion, he decided to create one right away. He balanced his PCW responsibilities with selling car care products. Samael has over two decades of experience as a wrestler who used the ring name The Sheik as a tribute to Ed Farhat. The promotion features several different styles of professional wrestling such as hardcore wrestling, lucha libre, and catch wrestling. Longtime wrestler Kevin Sullivan, known as “The Taskmaster” from his time in WCW, works behind-the-scenes with Josef Samael with the promotion as it continues to grow and expand its reach beyond the west coast.

In an interview with the podcast "Keeping it 100 with Konnan", Samael talks about the influence Sullivan has had on PCW Ultra's booking, and how Sullivan has taught him how to book, promote and format a show.  WWE Hall of Famer Jake "The Snake" Roberts also helped teach Samael. PCW Ultra's events are also featured on FITE TV PPV.

Event history 

In 2021 PCW Ultra made their return to wrestling post-pandemic and held its All Systems Go! event from ILWU Memorial Hall in Wilmington, California. The event featured matches from wrestlers like JTG, Steve Madison, Viva Van, The Bloodhunter with Kevin Sullivan, 2 Cold Scorpio, Alex Hammerstone, Alex Kane, Warbeast (Sheik, Fatu) and more. WWE Hall of Famer Ron Simmons also appeared at the event.

In 2020 PCW Ultra only held one event through the year out of the ILWU Memorial Hall in Wilmington, California due to the pandemic. January 10, 2020 PCW ULTRA held its Annual Anniversary 2K20 event featured matches from wrestlers like Chris Masters, Killer Kross, TJ Perkins. Ring of Honor, Sumie Sakai, The Bloodhunter with Kevin Sullivan, Sabu, Jake Atlas, Mil Muertes, Alex Hammerstone, Warbeast (Sheik and Fatu), Outlaws Inc (Eddie Kingston and Homicide) and more.

In 2019 PCW Ultra heald several events throughout the year out of the ILWU Memorial Hall in Wilmington, California. Some of these include Into the Void, which featured matches from wrestlers like Alex Hammerstone, Sumie Sakai, Viva Van, Brian Pillman Jr., Jacob Fatu, Eddie Kingston, Jake Atlas, Daga, Sheik, Homicide, Mil Muertes, WWE Hall of Famer Savio Vega, and more.

PCW Ultra also held its event No Quarter event on August 9, which featured matches from wrestlers like Mil Muertes, Dan Maff, Daga, Puma King, Matt Sydal, Brian Pillman Jr.,Jake Atlas, TJ Perkins, Sumie Sakai, Tessa Blanchard, Warbeast (Sheik and Fatu), Outlawz Inc. (Eddie Kingston and Homicide), WWE Hall of Famer Kelly Kelly and more.

On June 14, 2019, PCW Ultra held its Mind Crawler event which featured matches from wrestlers like, TJ Perkins, Adam Brooks, Jake Atlas, Brian Pillman Jr., Mil Muertes, Sami Callihan, Tessa Blanchard, Jordynne Grace, Trey Miguel, Warbeast (Sheik and Fatu), The Lucha Brothers (Pentagon Jr. and Rey Fenix) and more.
On March 29, 2019, PCW Ultra held its annual event Wrestle Summit that included wrestlers from different promotions like All Elite Wrestling, Impact Wrestling, Major League Wrestling, PCW Ultra, Defy Wrestling, and The Wrestling Revolver. the summit featured matches from wrestlers like Trey Miguel, Adam Brooks, Caleb Konley, Kikutaro, Tessa Blanchard, Daga, Taya Valkyrie, John Morrison, Sami Callihan, Brian Cage, Jake Atlas, Wes Lee, Warbeast (Sheik and Fatu), Nash Carter, Mil Muertes, Isaiah Scott and more.

On October 26, 2018, PCW Ultra held its Possessed event  from ILWU Memorial Hall in Wilmington, California. The event featured matches from wrestlers like Jake Atlas, Chris Bey, Marko Stunt, Alexander Hammerstone, Daga, Brody King, Puma King, Tessa Blanchard, Priscilla Kelly. Warbeast (Sheik and Fatu), Abyss, Sinn Bodhi,Isaiah Scott, Darby Allin, Pentagon Jr., P. J. Black and more.

Events glossary

Championships

Roster 
PCW Ultra's roster consists of wrestlers and figures such as independent freelancers, signed talent, and retired legends.

Fighting Athletes & Managers

Legends

Alumni

Staff

References

American professional wrestling promotions
American companies established in 2016
Companies based in Los Angeles
2016 establishments in California